Daughters of Destiny (UK title: Love, Soldiers and Women, French title: Destinées and Italian title: Destini di donne) is a 1954 Franco-Italian co-production motion picture comedy drama directed by Marcello Pagliero, Jean Delannoy and Christian-Jaque. The film stars Claudette Colbert (segment "Elisabeth"), Michèle Morgan (segment "Jeanne") and Martine Carol (segment "Lysistrata"). It tells three stories, which are unrelated, but each deal with a woman and war.

Plot
In this trilogy of stories, the episode "Elizabeth" is about an American war-widow who goes to Italy where her husband was in World War II. The episode "Jeanne" tells the life of Jeanne d'Arc. The episode "Lysistrata" is about Athenian wives, an adaptation of the Greek play.

Principal cast
segment "Elisabeth"
Claudette Colbert as Elizabeth Whitefield 
Eleonora Rossi Drago as Angela Ascari/Farmgirl 
Mirko Ellis as Anthony 
segment "Jeanne" 
Michèle Morgan as Jeanne d'Arc/Joan of Arc 
Michel Piccoli as Pasquerel   
Dora Doll as Une fille 
Katherine Kath as La ribaude 
segment "Lysistrata"
Martine Carol as Lysistrata 
Raf Vallone as Callias 
Paolo Stoppa as  Nicephore

References

External links
 
 
 

1954 films
1950s historical comedy-drama films
Films based on works by Aristophanes
French anthology films
1950s French-language films
1950s English-language films
English-language French films
English-language Italian films
French historical comedy-drama films
Italian historical comedy-drama films
Films directed by Christian-Jaque
Films directed by Jean Delannoy
Films directed by Marcello Pagliero
Italian anthology films
Films with screenplays by Jean Aurenche
Films with screenplays by Pierre Bost
Films about Joan of Arc
Works based on Lysistrata
1950s multilingual films
French multilingual films
Italian multilingual films
French black-and-white films
Italian black-and-white films
1950s Italian films
1950s French films
French-language Italian films